Anne Brolly is an Irish Aontú and former Sinn Féin politician and councillor who served on Limavady Borough Council in Northern Ireland. She is the wife of MLA Francie Brolly and together they form a singing duo and write songs. Their son Joe is a former footballer (now a  TV sports pundit) who played for the Derry county team.

In 2001, Brolly was elected as a councillor to Limavady Borough Council for the electoral area of Benbradagh. She topped the first preference votes with 1056, and her husband came in second with 917. He was also elected to the council. The quota was 840.

In 2003, Brolly took over from George Robinson of the Democratic Unionist Party (DUP) as the Mayor of Limavady. At Christmas 2003 she was asked to switch on the Christmas tree lights for Burnfoot. There was a small Loyalist protest during the switching-on of the lights because of  the election of a Sinn Féin mayor. Afterwards, the tree was cut down by vandals and the lights smashed. On 14 June 2004 Councillor Brolly stood down as Mayor.

In October 2004, the High Court of Northern Ireland ordered the government to provide the Brolly couple with protection, following reports of threats from the Red Hand Defenders, a Loyalist paramilitary group.

In 2005, she was re-elected to the council, but this time for the Limavady Town electoral area. She garnered 657 first preference votes, a total of 17.6% of the vote. She was the only Sinn Féin councillor elected in that area, coming third behind George Robinson and Alan Robinson both of the DUP.

In January 2008, Brolly and another councillor were confronted by a crowd in an "extremely nasty mood" outside the council's offices. Police were called.

In 2016, Brolly revealed that she left Sinn Féin over its support for abortion. In March 2018 she and her husband joined Aontú, a new anti-abortion republican party founded by former Sinn Féin TD Peadar Tóibín.

References

Living people
Sinn Féin politicians
Mayors of places in Northern Ireland
Members of Limavady Borough Council
Year of birth missing (living people)
Place of birth missing (living people)
Aontú politicians
Irish anti-abortion activists
Irish folk singers
Irish women singers
Musicians from County Londonderry
Sinn Féin councillors in Northern Ireland
Women councillors in Northern Ireland